|}

 

The Midlands Grand National is a Premier Handicp National Hunt race in Great Britain. It is a handicap steeplechase and is run at Uttoxeter Racecourse in March, over a distance of about 4 miles and 2 furlongs (4 miles, 2 furlongs and 8 yards, or ). During the race there are 25 fences to be jumped. The race held Listed status until 2022 and was re-classified as a Premier Handicap from the 2023 running when Listed status was removed from handicap races.

History
The first race was run on 3 May 1969. The race was initially run over 4m2f and was increased up to 4m4f in 1977. During this period it would have been, assuming accurate measurements, by 24 yards or approximately the length of a cricket pitch, the longest race in the NH calendar. In 1991 the distance was dropped to 4m, before being upped to 4m2f in 1993. The distance of the race was then reduced to 4m1½f in 2004 before being returned back to 4m2f in 2018. It is now the second-longest race in the British calendar, after the Grand National at Aintree.

The 1977 winner Watafella finished third in the race but was promoted to first place after the first and second, No Scotch and Evander were disqualified after it was realised they failed to meet the conditions of the race, along with three other runners.

The race was not covered on television in its early years but was shown by Channel 4 during the 1980s and up until 1998. The BBC took over coverage between 1998 and 2005 before the race returned to Channel 4, who continued to show it until their coverage of British racing ended in 2016. It is now broadcast on ITV Racing.

Records
Most successful horse:
 no horse has won the race more than once

Leading jockey (2 wins):
 Ken White – Happy Spring (1969), Rip’s Lyric (1973)
 Derek Morris – Midnight Madness (1987), Mister Ed (1993)
 Brendan Powell – Another Excuse (1996), Young Kenny (1999)
 Norman Williamson – Lucky Lane (1995), The Bunny Boiler (2002)

Leading trainer (4 wins):

 David Pipe – Minella Four Star (2011), Master Overseer (2012), Big Occasion (2013), Goulanes (2014)
 Widest winning margin – Another Excuse (1996) – distance
 Narrowest winning margin – Fighting Chance (1974), Knock Hill (1988) – head
 Most runners – 22, in 1978, 1979 and 1981
 Fewest runners – 6, in 2000

Winners

See also
 Horse racing in Great Britain
 List of British National Hunt races

External links
 Race Recordings 1991–2007

References

 Midlands National – BBC
 Midlands Grand National – 2006 Media Information
 WalesOnline – Leading bloodstock agent dies from cancer
 Racing Post:

National Hunt races in Great Britain
National Hunt chases
Recurring sporting events established in 1969
1969 establishments in England